This is a list of notable Bangladeshi Americans, including both original immigrants who obtained American citizenship and their American descendants. 

To be included in this list, the person must have a Wikipedia article showing they are Bangladeshi American or must have references showing they are Bangladeshi American and are notable.

Academia and science
 Abdus Suttar Khan, chemist and aerospace researcher
 Abul Hussam, inventor of the Sono arsenic filter
 Asif Azam Siddiqi, space historian, currently serves as an assistant professor of history at Fordham University
 Maqsudul Alam, scientist and professor, achieved three milestones in genomics - sequencing the genomes of papaya, rubber plants and jute at University of Hawaii.
 Mir Masoom Ali, George and Frances Ball Distinguished Professor Emeritus of Statistics Ball State University
 Leepu Nizamuddin Awlia, car engineer, designer and coachbuilder
 Fazle Hussain, Professor of Mechanical Engineering at Texas Tech University. 
 M. Zahid Hasan, scientist and Eugene Higgins endowed chair professor of quantum physics, at Princeton University Elected Fellow of the American Academy of Arts and Sciences.
 Mohammad Ataul Karim, Scientist; ranked amongst the top 50 researchers who contributed most to Applied Optics in its 50-year history
 Fazlur Rahman Khan, structural engineer
 Jalal Alamgir, academic and an associate professor of political science at the University of Massachusetts-Boston
 Latifur Khan, known for stream analytics work in the field of data mining (in computer science area); ranked amongst the top 2200 researchers/scientists in the world who contributed most to Computer Science and Electronics 
 K. Sabeel Rahman, legal scholar

Arts and entertainment 

Abdul "Duke" Fakir, singer
Hasan M. Elahi, interdisciplinary media artist 
 Firoz Mahmud, visual artist/creator, painter, academician
 Anik Khan, rapper from Queens
 Rahsaan Islam, actor
Palbasha Siddique, singer
Sanjoy, Bangladeshi–American musician, electronic music producer and DJ
 Monica Yunus, soprano singer, daughter of Muhammad Yunus and Vera Forostenko
 Shikhee, singer and auteur of industrial band Android Lust
 Jai Wolf, electronic music producer
 Fuad al Muqtadir, musician
 Marjana Chowdhury, model, philanthropist and beauty queen Miss Bangladesh USA
 Ellis Miah, music producer
 Kamal Ahmed, comedian, part of the Jerky Boys duo
 Naeem Mohaiemen, filmmaker, writer, visual artist

Business
 Omar Ishrak, Chairman of Intel and Medtronic
 Jawed Karim, co-founder of YouTube and lead technical architect of PayPal
 Salman Khan, founder of Khan Academy 
 Kamal Quadir, founder and CEO of CellBazaar Inc, First Mover Fellow of The Aspen Institute, TEDIndia Fellow
 Iqbal Quadir, founder of Grameen Phone, Bangladesh's largest telecom group
 Fahim Saleh, founder and CEO of Pathao and Gokada

Politics and civil service 
 Abuhena Saifulislam, first Muslim to be appointed as imam in the U.S. Navy
 M. Osman Siddique, former US Ambassador
Shahana Hanif, politician and activist 
Nabilah Islam, politician ans activist

Literature 
 Dilruba Ahmed, poet and historian
 Rumaan Alam, award-winning novelist
 Sezan Mahmud, writer, lyricist, columnist and physician

Media and journalism 

 Reihan Salam, blogger at The American Scene and associate editor of The Atlantic Monthly

Sports 
 Muhammad Ali, professional boxer and activist. He was a Bangladeshi citizen, and held a Bangladeshi passport
 Syque Caesar, American artistic gymnast, member of Michigan Wolverines
 Saif Ahmad, World Series of Poker winner

See also
 List of Bangladesh-related topics
 List of Bangladeshi people
 List of Bengalis
 List of British Bangladeshis

References

Bangladeshi
Bangladeshi Americans
Americans
Bangladeshi